Syed Nehal Hashmi (born 28 January 1960) is a Pakistani Constitutional Lawyer and  politician who was a member of the Senate of Pakistan, from March 2015 to February 2018.

Early life
Mr. Nehal Hashmi was born on 28 January 1960 in an Urdu-speaking family hailing from the Bihar district of India.
He was a prominent student leader and founded his own political organisation by the name of All Pakistan Youth league, and served as its president before joining PML-N in 1992.

Mr.Nehal Hashmi Hashmi is considered as one of the most prominent and renowned Criminal and Constitutional Lawyers in Pakistan and started practicing law in the late 1980s. Mr. Hashmi is also the Managing Partner of Nehal Hashmi law Associates, and  many of his mentees are serving in the Judiciary of Pakistan including the Sessions Court and High Court in Pakistan.

In his early days as a lawyer, he became known for filling Constitution petition on Social, Public, and Humanitarian issue and earned the title of "Mr Petitioner" amongst the masses. He has over 25 reported cases in the Law Journals of Pakistan and has remained associated with some of the most high-profile cases, to name a few he rendered his legal services in the Murtaza Bhutto's Murder trial, Former Prime Minister Nawaz Sharif's NAB case in 1999, and Russian Hi-jacker case.

Political career

Mr. Hashmi was the adviser to Prime Minister of Pakistan Muhammad Nawaz Sharif on Law Justice and Human Rights from 1997 to 1999.

He was serving as the President of Pakistan Muslim League (N) (PML-N) chapter in Karachi during 2012.

In August 2014, he was appointed as the General Secretary of PML-N chapter in Sindh. In October 2014, he was re-appointed as the General Secretary of PML-N Sindh.

He was elected to the Senate of Pakistan on general seat from Punjab as a candidate of PML-N in 2015 Pakistani Senate election.

He has served as the advisor to the Prime Minister of Pakistan on law''', justice and human rights.

In May 2017, his membership in PML-N was suspended and he was asked to resign from the membership of Senate by Prime Minister Nawaz Sharif for violating the party discipline. After which he announced to resign from the Senate. In June 2017, he withdrew his resignation from Senate after a meeting with the chairman of the Senate.

On 1 February 2018, Hashmi was convicted by the Supreme Court of Pakistan in a contempt of court case. He was sentenced to one month imprisonment, and was barred from holding public office for a period of next five years. On the same day, he ceased to be a member of the Senate and was arrested. He was released from jail after a month on 28 February.

References

Living people
Pakistani senators (14th Parliament)
Pakistan Muslim League (N) politicians
Pakistani lawyers
Politicians from Karachi
1960 births
Pakistani prisoners and detainees
People expelled from public office
Pakistani politicians convicted of crimes